Ghazal Hakimifard (born 14 April 1994) is an Iranian chess player who holds the FIDE title of Woman Grandmaster (WGM, 2016). She is an Iranian Women's Chess Championship winner (2010).

Biography
In 2007, Hakimifard won bronze medal in Asian Youth Chess Championship in U14 girl's age group. She is multiple medalist of Iranian Women's Chess Championship: gold (2010), silver (2012) and bronze (2011).

She played for Iran in the Women's Chess Olympiads:
 In 2010, at reserve board in the 39th Chess Olympiad (women) in Khanty-Mansiysk (+5, =0, -2),
 In 2012, at fourth board in the 40th Chess Olympiad (women) in Istanbul (+6, =2, -0),
 In 2014, at fourth board in the 41st Chess Olympiad (women) in Tromsø (+5, =0, -2),
 In 2016, at fourth board in the 42nd Chess Olympiad (women) in Baku (+5, =4, -1).

Hakimifard played for Iran and Iran 2 teams in the Women's Asian Team Chess Championships:
 In 2005, at first reserve board in the 4th Asian Team Chess Championship (women) in Isfahan (+2, =1, -1) and won team bronze medal,
 In 2014, at fourth board in the 8th Asian Women's Nations Chess Cup in Tabriz (+0, =2, -1) and won team bronze medal.

She played for Iran in the Asian Games:
 In 2010, at fourth board in the 16th Asian Games (chess - women) in Guangzhou (+2, =2, -1).

In 2011, Hakimifard received the FIDE Woman International Master (WIM) title, and in 2016, she received the FIDE Woman Grandmaster (WGM) title.

References

External links
 
 
 
 

1994 births
Living people
Iranian female chess players
Chess woman grandmasters
Chess Olympiad competitors
Chess players at the 2010 Asian Games
Asian Games competitors for Iran